Fabio Celestini (born 31 October 1975) is a Swiss football manager and former player. A defensive midfielder, he started and finished his 15-year professional career with Lausanne, and also played for ten years in France and Spain, representing four clubs. He appeared with the Swiss national team at Euro 2004.

After retiring as a player, he moved into management. He was most recently in charge as manager of Swiss Super League club FC Sion.

Club career
Born in Lausanne, Celestini started playing professionally with hometown's FC Lausanne-Sport, then had a four-season spell in France, spending two years each with Troyes AC and Olympique de Marseille. Whilst with the latter he played the 2004 UEFA Cup final, coming on as a substitute in the second half of the 0–2 loss to Valencia CF.

Celestini moved to Spain in 2004, playing one season with Levante UD. After the team's immediate relegation he stayed in the country, joining fellow La Liga club Getafe CF where he never was an undisputed starter, but managed to feature heavily in consecutive seasons. In 2007–08, as the Madrid outskirts side reached the quarter-finals in the UEFA Cup, he scored against R.S.C. Anderlecht in a 2–1 group stage home win.

On 16 February 2010, after having been regularly used in the past two seasons, albeit not as a usual first-choice, the 34-year-old Celestini announced he would not renew his contract with Getafe, choosing to return to Lausanne on a one-year deal. However, due to a break in negotiations over his future role at the club after his playing career, he decided to retire before the end of the campaign, playing his last game on 15 December against U.S. Città di Palermo in the Europa League group stage.

On 24 March 2015, after a spell as assistant manager at Spanish club Málaga CF and head coach with Italian amateurs Terracina Calcio 1925, Celestini replaced Marco Simone at Lausanne-Sport in the latter capacity, as the side was in a poor run of results in the Swiss Challenge League. Two months later, he was confirmed in this role for the next three years.

In 2015–16, Celestini led his team back to the Swiss Super League after a two-year absence. On 3 October 2018, he was appointed at FC Lugano in the same division. Just over a year later, he was ousted from his job due to bad results, and replaced by Maurizio Jacobacci.

Celestini signed as manager of FC Luzern on 2 January 2020. His contract with the club was terminated on 22 November 2021, after spending the majority of the season in the bottom of the league, having only accrued ten points in 14 games.

On 21 November 2022, he took on as new head coach of FC Sion. He was sacked on 3 March 2023.

International career
A Switzerland international since 1998, Celestini collected 35 caps and was a participant at the UEFA Euro 2004 (appearing in two incomplete matches, as the nation exited in the group stage).

References

External links

1975 births
Living people
Sportspeople from Lausanne
Swiss people of Italian descent
Swiss men's footballers
Association football midfielders
Swiss Super League players
FC Lausanne-Sport players
Ligue 1 players
ES Troyes AC players
Olympique de Marseille players
La Liga players
Levante UD footballers
Getafe CF footballers
Switzerland international footballers
UEFA Euro 2004 players
Swiss expatriate footballers
Expatriate footballers in France
Expatriate footballers in Spain
Swiss expatriate sportspeople in France
Swiss expatriate sportspeople in Spain
Swiss football managers
FC Lausanne-Sport managers
FC Lugano managers
FC Luzern managers
FC Sion managers
Swiss expatriate football managers
Expatriate football managers in Italy
Swiss expatriate sportspeople in Italy